Zenophleps alpinata is a moth of the family Geometridae first described by Samuel E. Cassino in 1927. It is found in Canada, including Alberta and British Columbia.

The wingspan is about 25 millimetres.

References

Xanthorhoini